"Batbaby" is the sixth single by comedy band The Superions, a side project of Fred Schneider of The B-52s. The single was released on September 13, 2011 as a digital download on the Batbaby EP.

The Batbaby EP also features remixes by DJ Beekeeni, DJ Butterface, Phylr and Umpff. In an interview with Atlanta magazine, Schneider attempted to explain his lyrical inspiration: "Oh, I don't know. Some songwriters come up with incredibly smart commercial things and I come up with 'Batbaby'."

Track listing
 "Batbaby" 3:22
 "Batbaby (DJ Beekeeni Remix)"* 3:07
 "Batbaby (DJ Butterface Remix)"** 3:55
 "Batbaby (DJ Butterface Downtempo Remix)"** 4:11
 "Batbaby (DJ Butterface vs. Phylr Remix)"*** 4:45
 "Batbaby (Umpff Remix)"**** 3:41
 "Batbaby (Umpff Dub Remix)"**** 3:56

Personnel 
Band
 Fred Schneider - lyrics and vocals
 Noah Brodie - keyboards and electronic drums
 Dan Marshall - programming

Additional musicians
 Amy Luther - Backing vocals
 Rachel McCabe - Backing vocals
 DJ Beekeeni - *additional remix and production
 DJ Butterface (Michael J. Bazini) - **additional remix and production
 DJ Butterface and Phylr - ***additional remix and production
 Umpff - ****additional remix and production (original master by Tim Harris/Headway Productions)

Production
 Recorded and Mixed by The Superions
 Producer: The Superions
 Mastering: Bob Katz at Digital Domain
 Artwork: George Doutsiopoulos

Music video 
A music video was filmed in Winter Park and Orlando, Florida on October 10, 2011 (Ed Wood's birthday). The mini-movie video is sort of an homage to the beatnik/horror mashup genre of the ’60s. It is a 10-minute music video that merges film-making with music, similar to Michael Jackson's Thriller. The video debuted on YouTube on October 19, 2011 and the following day on the WOW Report James St. James declared Batbaby "an instant Halloween classic."

References

External links
 
 thesuperions.com
  The Superions Facebook
 The Superions Twitter
 The Superions Pinterest

The Superions songs
2011 songs
Songs written by Fred Schneider